Brand New Morning is the 13th studio album by the English rock band Magnum, released in 2004 by SPV.

"We All Run" is an apocalyptic song. "It's actually about the nuclear holocaust", Tony Clarkin explained. "The idea of the song is we all ignore the important things in life. And the actual verse is that it is really poetic license trying to create a picture "We all run" as "We don't care anymore". Like the cities are burning, like people are starving to death. That's what it means."

The lyrics to "Brand New Morning" can be considered as a reflection by Clarkin, following the heart attack he suffered in 2002. Bob Catley commented, "We are a heavy lyric band. With the song "Brand New Morning" it is like the first day of the rest of your life. Forget everything else. Just wake up with the sun shining and start living. That is what 'Brand New Morning' is all about." The song was covered by Iron Maiden vocalist Bruce Dickinson before the album was released.

The album marks the final departure from the style of Hard Rain. According to Bob Catley, Brand New Morning can be considered as the real return of Magnum following the 1995-2001 split, as it took Clarkin one album to get back into writing for Magnum.

Track listing

Personnel 
 Tony Clarkin — guitar
 Bob Catley — vocals
 Al Barrow — bass guitar
 Mark Stanway — keyboards
 Harry James — drums

References

External links 
 www.magnumonline.co.uk — Official Magnum site

2004 albums
Magnum (band) albums
Albums produced by Tony Clarkin
SPV/Steamhammer albums